The Bethlehem Green Historic District is a historic district in the center of the town of Bethlehem, Connecticut, listed on the National Register of Historic Places in 1982 for the architectural significance of the houses around the town green.

The Bethlehem Green is a triangular park bounded on the east by Route 61 (Main Street), on the north by Route 132 (West Road), and on the west by the street called "The Green". Within the green are five tablet monuments and a large green boulder monument listing names of Bethlehem residents who served in various wars from the American Revolution to World War II. A flagpole lies opposite the monuments. Maple trees have been planted around the perimeter of the green, and a large evergreen tree (decorated as a Christmas tree in winter) is located in the center of the green.

Historic buildings around the green include the Congregational church (1790), the townhouse (1839), the Episcopal Church (1832), two 18th-century taverns now used as residences, a general store built on the site of a former store built in the 19th century, and a former school building.

The district is also the site of the Bellamy-Ferriday House and Garden (Joseph Bellamy House), which is listed separately on the National Register of Historic Places, and of the original meetinghouse of Bethlehem built in 1767. The original meetinghouse no longer stands but its site is marked by a granite obelisk.

See also
National Register of Historic Places listings in Litchfield County, Connecticut

References

Bethlehem, Connecticut
Historic districts in Litchfield County, Connecticut
Greek Revival architecture in Connecticut
National Register of Historic Places in Litchfield County, Connecticut
New England town greens
Historic districts on the National Register of Historic Places in Connecticut